Dunay is a rural locality (a village) in Nyuksenskoye Rural Settlement, Nyuksensky District, Vologda Oblast, Russia. The population was 61 as of 2002. There are 4 streets.

Geography 
Dunay is located 18 km east of Nyuksenitsa (the district's administrative centre) by road. Oleshkovka is the nearest rural locality.

References 

Rural localities in Nyuksensky District